The ninth Minnesota Legislature first convened on January 8, 1867. The 22 members of the Minnesota Senate and the 47 members of the Minnesota House of Representatives were elected during the General Election of November 6, 1866. The Minnesota Senate, at the time, was normally elected to staggered terms, but an increase in the number of members to be elected to both houses forced a new election of all members of the Legislature.

Sessions 
The legislature met in a regular session from January 8, 1867 to March 8, 1867. There were no special sessions of the 9th Minnesota Legislature.

Party summary

Senate

House of Representatives

Leadership

Senate 
Lieutenant Governor
Thomas Henry Armstrong (R-High Forest)

House of Representatives 
Speaker of the House
John Q. Farmer (R-Spring Valley)

Members

Senate

House of Representatives

Membership changes

House of Representatives

References 

 Minnesota Legislators Past & Present - Session Search Results (Session 9, Senate)
 Minnesota Legislators Past & Present - Session Search Results (Session 9, House)
 Journal of the Senate of the Ninth Session of the Legislature of the State of Minnesota
 Journal of the House of Representatives of the Ninth Session of the Legislature of the State of Minnesota

09th
1860s in Minnesota